The Moses Ben Maimon Synagogue is a synagogue located in Abu Dhabi, the capital city of the United Arab Emirates. The synagogue was officially opened on February 17, 2023, and is named after the 12th century Jewish philosopher Moses Ben Maimon. The synagogue is the first of its kind in the UAE. It is a part of the larger Abrahamic Family House complex.

Architecture 
The synagogue's design by Sir David Adjaye is a modern interpretation of traditional Jewish architecture. The building features a crisscross diagrid façade and soffit, which represents the palm trees used to build a Sukkah. The Sukkah is a temporary shelter used during the Jewish festival of Sukkot. The structure provides protection from the sun and allows the stars to be seen at night.

The Moses Ben Maimon Synagogue has seven pillars on the ground and eight above supporting the roof. The metallic bronze structure, emanating natural light and shaped like a curtain, hovers up by the roof. The zig-zag shapes of the structure are similar to tents and represent Jewish communities of old congregating to practice their religion. The bronze chainmail represents the tent-like structure of the Sukkah, and the skylight references a chuppah, a temporary structure used during Jewish marriages for the couple to stand under fabric beneath a sea of stars.

The interior of the Moses Ben Maimon Synagogue is decorated with traditional Jewish symbols and features. The Ten Commandments are printed in Hebrew and flank the walls of the prayer hall. The synagogue also includes a mikveh, a bath used for the purpose of ritual immersion, which is located outside the prayer hall. There is also a smaller space for religious studies.

History 
The idea for the Abrahamic Family House, which includes the Imam Al-Tayeb Mosque, was announced on February 5, 2019, by Sheikh Abdullah bin Zayed, the Minister of Foreign Affairs and International Co-operation, during a meeting of the Higher Committee of Human Fraternity at the New York Public Library. The goal of the Abrahamic Family House is to promote interfaith understanding and dialogue between different religions.

The synagogue is after the 12th-century Jewish scholar and astronomer, Moses Ben Maimon (commonly known as Maimonides) who worked in Morocco and Egypt. He was one of the most prolific and influential Torah scholars of the Middle Ages. He was born in Córdoba, Spain in 1135 and was a doctor by profession. He spent 12 years traveling before settling in Cairo, where Maimonides lived for the rest of his life, teaching and writing about Judaism. He died in Cairo in 1204.

The opening ceremony of the Moses Ben Maimon Synagogue was attended by members of the Jewish community in Abu Dhabi, as well as government officials and other religious leaders. Rabbi Yehuda Sarna, the chief rabbi of the Moses Ben Maimon Synagogue, opened the event and cantor Alex Peterfreund led the congregants through a series of verses. Sarna then invited Rabbi Levi Duchman, the first resident rabbi of the United Arab Emirates and head of Chabad in the UAE, to recite a Jewish prayer in Hebrew for the leaders and government of the UAE. The same prayer was also delivered in Arabic by Rabbi Yosef Hamdi, the leader of the small Jewish Yemenite community in Abu Dhabi that was rescued two years ago by the Emirati government.

See also 

 Abrahamic Family House
 Document on Human Fraternity

External links 

 Official website

References

Abrahamic Family House
History of the Jews in the Arabian Peninsula
Jews and Judaism in the United Arab Emirates